Jane Fairfax and Mrs. Bates
Jane Austen, Emma, 1815
External link #1
External link #2
External link #3

Mrs. Smith and Nurse Rooke
Jane Austen, Persuasion, 1817
External link

Mrs. Gummidge and Mrs. Peggotty
Charles Dickens, David Copperfield, 1849-1850
External link #1

Miss Ophelia
Harriet Beecher Stowe, Uncle Tom's Cabin, 1852
External link #1
External link #2
External link #3
External link #4
External link #5

Brigitte and Madame Thuillier
Honoré de Balzac, Les Petits Bourgeois, 1855
External link

Madame Thérèse Defarge 
Charles Dickens, A Tale of Two Cities, 1859
External link #1
External link #2
External link #3
External link #4

Anna Makarovna
Leo Tolstoy, War and Peace, 1869
External link

Mrs. Elliot and Mrs. Thornbury
Virginia Woolf, The Voyage Out, 1915
External link

Mrs. Ramsay
Virginia Woolf, To the Lighthouse, 1927

Miss Marple
Agatha Christie, Various, 1927-1976

Miss Maud Silver

Patricia Wentworth, Various, 1928-1961

Hilda Hopkins

Vivienne Fagan, Hilda Hopkins, Murder She Knit, 2011

Other external links
 WoolWorks Knitting references in books

People in knitting
Fictional artists
Lists of fictional characters by occupation